The 2018 season of the Tamil Nadu Premier League is the third edition of the TNPL, a professional Twenty20 cricket league in Tamil Nadu, India. The league was formed by the Tamil Nadu Cricket Association (TNCA) in 2016.

Teams

Source: Cricbuzz

Squads

Fixtures and Match Summary

The schedule of the round robin matches is provided below in details.

Tournament Results

Points Table
  advanced to the playoffs

References

Tamil Nadu Premier League
2018 in Indian cricket
Cricket in Tamil Nadu